The 1954 All-Ireland Junior Hurling Championship was the 33rd staging of the All-Ireland Junior Championship since its establishment by the Gaelic Athletic Association in 1912.

Tipperary entered the championship as the defending champions, however, they were beaten by Limerick in the Munster final.

The All-Ireland final was played on 10 October 1954 at Mitcham Stadium in London, between Limerick and London, in what was their first meeting in a final in 19 years. Limerick won the match by 4-06 to 2-04 to claim their third championship title overall and a first title since 1941.

Results

All-Ireland Junior Hurling Championship

All-Ireland home final

All-Ireland home final

All-Ireland final

References

Junior
All-Ireland Junior Hurling Championship